The Stanford Doerr School of Sustainability is a school at Stanford University focusing on climate change and sustainability. It opened on September 1, 2022, as Stanford's first new school since the School of Humanities and Sciences in 1948. It will be one of the largest climate change–related schools in the United States.

Arun Majumdar will be the school's first dean. Initially, the school will have 90 faculty members. It has plans to add 60 more faculty members over 10 years and construct two new buildings adjacent to the existing Green Earth Sciences and Jerry Yang and Akiko Yamazaki Environment and Energy buildings. It will incorporate the academic departments and interdisciplinary programs of the School of Earth, Energy & Environmental Sciences, Woods Institute for the Environment, and Precourt Institute for Energy and will award both undergraduate and graduate degrees. The school will also include the Hopkins Marine Station and a startup accelerator. Despite being Stanford's newest school, it will include the university's oldest academic department, geology. The Department of Civil & Environmental Engineering will be a joint department within the School of Sustainability and the School of Engineering.

Funding
Stanford has raised $ for the establishment of the school, including $ from venture capitalist John Doerr and his wife Ann, after whom the school is named. The Doerrs' gift was the largest ever given to a university for the establishment of a new school and the second largest gift to an academic institution; it makes the Doerrs the top funders of climate change research and scholarship. Other donors include Yahoo! cofounders Jerry Yang and David Filo and their spouses, Akiko Yamazaki and Angela Filo. The Doerr School has also received funding from ExxonMobil, TotalEnergies, Shell, Saudi Aramco, Petrobras, and many other oil and gas companies via the Doerr School's industry affiliates program and the Precourt Institute. Dean Majumdar has indicated that the Doerr School is open to continuing to accept funding from and to work with fossil fuel companies, drawing criticism from Stanford students, faculty, staff, and alumni.

References

External links 
 

Doerr School of Sustainability
Educational institutions established in 2022
2022 establishments in California
Sustainability organizations
Climate change organizations based in the United States